Tan Weidong (born May 9, 1970) is a Chinese male curler and curling coach.

Record as a coach of national teams

References

External links
 
 
 
 Video:  (interviews with China skip Liu Sijia, China coach Tan Weidong, Canadians Alison Kreviazuk and Rachel Homan, and US Allison Pottinger)

1970 births
Living people
Chinese male curlers
Chinese curling coaches